George Mitchell (1 April 1867 – 4 July 1937) served as Prime Minister of Southern Rhodesia from July to September 1933.

Early life
Born in Ayrshire in the south-west of Scotland, he emigrated to South Africa in 1889, and moved to Matabeleland six years later to work as the manager of the Bank of Africa branch in Bulawayo. In 1901 he left the bank to become General Manager of the Rhodesia Exploration and Development Company, which sought to build up property.

Political career
Elected as a Member of the Southern Rhodesian Legislative Council in 1911 for the Western District, in 1918 Mitchell retired from business and thereafter devoted himself to politics where he was a supporter of the Rhodesia Party and of responsible government within the colony of Southern Rhodesia. Re-elected as the member for the Bulawayo District in 1914, he retired from the council in 1920. With the grant of responsible government in 1923, Mitchell stood at the first election to the Southern Rhodesian Legislative Assembly for the seat of Bulawayo South, but was unsuccessful. He stood again at the 1928 election for the seat of Gwanda and was successful. He was appointed to the Government of Southern Rhodesia on 1 November 1930 as Minister of Mines and Public Works. From 19 May 1932, he served as Minister of Mines and Agriculture.

When Howard Moffat resigned in 1933, Mitchell was chosen as the new Premier and chose to change the job title to Prime Minister. His government was a short one, lasting from 5 July 1933 until the Rhodesia Party lost the general election of September 1933, with Mitchell losing his own seat in the process, to the Reform Party led by Godfrey Huggins.

References

|-

|-

|-

Prime Ministers of Rhodesia
Rhodesian politicians
White Rhodesian people
1867 births
1937 deaths
British emigrants to Rhodesia
Zimbabwean people of Scottish descent
Members of the Legislative Assembly of Southern Rhodesia